The Stones Jazz is an album by jazz guitarist Joe Pass that was released in 1967. Except for one song, all tracks are jazz covers of songs recorded by The Rolling Stones.

Reception

Writing for Allmusic, music critic Ken Dryden wrote of the album "...this LP was clearly one for a paycheck when most jazz players were scratching for work... A very unlikely candidate for reissue on CD, this record will be sought by Joe Pass fanatics only."

Track listing
All songs by Mick Jagger and Keith Richards unless otherwise noted.
 "Play with Fire" (Nanker Phelge)
 "19th Nervous Breakdown"
 "I Am Waiting"
 "Lady Jane"
 "Not Fade Away" (Buddy Holly, Norman Petty)
 "Mother's Little Helper"
 "(I Can't Get No) Satisfaction"
 "Paint It Black"
 "What a Shame"
 "As Tears Go By" (Jagger, Richards, Andrew Loog Oldham)
 "Stone Jazz" (Joe Pass)

Personnel
 Joe Pass – guitar
 Milt Bernhart – trombone
 Dick Hamilton – trombone
 Herbie Harper – trombone
 Gail Martin – trombone
 Bill Perkins – tenor saxophone
 Bob Florence – piano, arranger, conductor
 Dennis Budimir – guitar
 John Pisano – guitar
 Ray Brown – double bass
 John Guerin – drums
 Victor Feldman – percussion
 Bruce Botnick – engineer

References

1966 albums
Joe Pass albums
Pacific Jazz Records albums